Utthaan is a Hindi film produced by Kumar Sanu. The film was directed by Ujjwal Chatterje. The film stars Priyanshu Chatterjee and Neha Dhupia. The film's music is also by Kumar Sanu.

Cast
 Priyanshu Chatterjee as Prashant Bharti
 Neha Dhupia as Kiran Talreja
 Sudesh Berry as Miss Mumbai Contest Judge
 Kumar Sanu as Beauty Contest Judge
 Birbal as Farmhouse Manager
 Preeti Puri as Neha Chaudhary
 Saroj Khan as Beauty Contest Judge
 Anang Desai as Chaudhary, Neha's father
 Veena Malik as Mrs. Talreja
 Anjan Srivastav as Shribhavna Prasad (Home Minister)

Songs
"Ab Neend Kise Ab Chain Kaha (Remix)" - Kumar Sanu, Alka Yagnik
"Abhee Tum Ho Kamsin" - Kumar Sanu, Sapna Mukherjee
"Chhinate Hai Chain Sabakee" - Hema Sardesai
"Ha Abb Nind Kise" - Alka Yagnik, Kumar Sanu
"Ye Kaisa Utthan Hai (II)" - Asha Bhosle
"Yeh Aisa Utthaan Hai" - Sonu Nigam

External links 
 

2006 films
2000s Hindi-language films
Films scored by Kumar Sanu